Gabriel Silberstein (born 17 October 1974) is a former professional tennis player from Chile.

Biography

Early career
As a junior he was a strong performer and most notably finished runner-up in the boys' doubles with Marcelo Ríos at the 1992 US Open. He won his first Challenger match aged 17 and in 1992 won a Challenger tournament in Ribeirão.

Professional tour
In 1993 he began competing professionally and made his first ATP Tour main draw appearance the following year at Santiago. He was one of the successful qualifiers at the 1995 ATP German Open, a top-tier event now known as the Hamburg Masters. At the end of the 1997 season he reached his best ranking of 131 in the world, following a year which included wins over Karol Kučera in St Poelten and Carlos Costa in Santiago.

Representative career
Silberstein featured in a total of 9 ties for the Chile Davis Cup team from 1993 to 1997.

In 1995 he suffered disappointment, having started a tie against Argentina with a win over Franco Davín, it was his loss to Javier Frana in the final reverse singles that decided the tie, a match Silbertein led two sets to love.

He helped Chile reach the World Group qualifiers in the 1997 Davis Cup. His defeat of Ecuador's Nicolás Lapentti in five sets started Chile's campaign and he finished off the tie by beating Luis Morejón in a dead rubber to secure a 4-1 win. His most significant contribution came in the next tie, against Argentina at the National Stadium in Santiago. With the tie level at 1-1, a scoreline which included a loss for Silberstein to Hernán Gumy, he teamed up with Ríos in the doubles to beat Javier Frana and Luis Lobo in five sets. Ríos then gave Chile the tie over their South American rivals with victory in the first of the reverse singles, setting up a qualifying match against India. History repeated itself in the tie with India, as Silberstein again squandered a two set lead in the fifth and deciding rubber, to lose to Mahesh Bhupathi. He finished his Davis Cup career with an 8-6 record in singles, 11-9 overall.

At the 1995 Pan American Games he won a bronze medal for Chile in the men's doubles event, with partner Sergio Cortés.

Personal life
Silberstein emigrated to Chile from West Germany. He was born in Neumünster, a city in the northern state of Schleswig-Holstein.

His youngest brother, Álvaro, was seriously injured in a 2004 car accident, which left him with full paralysis from the chest down In 2016 Álvaro trekked Patagonia in a wheelchair, a trip that captured media attention and was filmed by a documentary crew.

ATP Challenger and ITF Futures finals

Singles: 3 (1–2)

Doubles: 2 (0–2)

Junior Grand Slam finals

Doubles: 1 (1 runner-up)

See also
List of Chile Davis Cup team representatives

References

External links
 
 
 

1974 births
Living people
Chilean male tennis players
German emigrants to Chile
People from Neumünster
Sportspeople from Schleswig-Holstein
Pan American Games bronze medalists for Chile
Pan American Games medalists in tennis
Tennis players at the 1995 Pan American Games
Medalists at the 1995 Pan American Games